Oceanian junior records in the sport of athletics are ratified by the Oceania Athletics Association (OAA). Athletics records comprise the best performance of an athlete before the year of their 20th birthday.  Technically, in all under 20 age divisions, the age is calculated "on December 31 of the year of competition" to avoid age group switching during a competitive season.

Outdoor
Key:

Mx = mark was set in a mixed race

h = hand timing

NWI = no wind information

OT = oversized track

Men

Women

Mixed

Indoor

Men

Women

Notes

References
General
Oceania Records 5 December 2022 updated
Specific

Junior records
Oceanian